My True Love Sings is a 1956 LP by the Robert Shaw Chorale, conducted by Robert Shaw.

Soundtrack
The album contains the following songs:

Side 1

 Annie Laurie, Alicia Ann Spottiswoode, words attributed to William Douglass
 Jeanie with the Light Brown Hair, English traditional, words by Stephen Foster
 When love is kind, words Thomas Moore, Thomas Pyle, baritone
 Johnny Has Gone for a Soldier, traditional Irish and American folk song, Louisa Natale, coloratura soprano
 I Know My Love, Irish traditional
 Comin' Thro' the Rye, words Robert Burns, Jane Craner, mezzo-soprano
 Black, black, black is the color of my true love's hair, Appalachian traditional song, Clayton Krehbiel, tenor
 Da unten im Thale, Bavarian folksong
 Flow gently, sweet Afton, Jonathan E. Spilman, words Robert Burns, Thomas Motto, tenor

Side 2

 Treue Liebe, German traditional
 Adiós, Catedral de Burgos, Spanish traditional, Florence Kopleff, contralto
 Auprès de ma blonde, French traditional
 He's gone away, American traditional, Louisa Natale, coloratura soprano
 A Red, Red Rose, Scottish traditional, words Robert Burns, William Diard, tenor
 Al olivo, Spanish traditional
 In stiller Nacht, German traditional, words Friedrich Spee von Langenfeld
 The soldier boy, American traditional, Jane Craner, mezzo-soprano
 Fa una canzone, composer Orazio Vecchi

1956 albums
Robert Shaw (conductor) albums
RCA Victor albums